The Patterson Brothers Commercial Building and House (Rogers Hardware) was an historic commercial building in Valley Falls, a village of Cumberland, Rhode Island.

The Italianate building was constructed in 1882 and added to the National Register of Historic Places in 1993. It was demolished in 1998.

See also
National Register of Historic Places listings in Providence County, Rhode Island

References

Houses on the National Register of Historic Places in Rhode Island
Demolished buildings and structures in Rhode Island
Commercial buildings on the National Register of Historic Places in Rhode Island
Buildings and structures in Cumberland, Rhode Island
National Register of Historic Places in Providence County, Rhode Island
Buildings and structures demolished in 1998